"Raise Up" is a song by American rock band Saliva. It was released in 2003 as the third single off their third studio album Back Into Your System (2002). The song reached number 29 on the Billboard Mainstream Rock chart.

Charts

References

2002 songs
2003 singles
Saliva (band) songs
Island Records singles
Song recordings produced by Bob Marlette
Songs written by Josey Scott